Bradley L. Pyburn is a United States Air Force major general who has served as the chief of staff of the United States Cyber Command since June 9, 2022. He previously served as the deputy commander of the Sixteenth Air Force.

In March 2022, Pyburn was reassigned as chief of staff of the United States Cyber Command. In May 2022, he was nominated for promotion to major general.

References 

 

Living people
Year of birth missing (living people)
Place of birth missing (living people)
United States Air Force generals
Brigadier generals